The  Rich-Twinn Octagon House built in 1849 is an historic octagonal house located at 145 Main Street in Akron, New York. It is one of three known octagon houses in Erie County, New York and was "meticulously restored" prior to its 1994 nomination to the National Register.

On February 10, 1995, it was added to the National Register of Historic Places. Today it is a house museum and is occasionally open for touring.

References

External links

Newstead Historical Society: Rich-Twinn Octagon House, includes tour info

Houses on the National Register of Historic Places in New York (state)
Houses completed in 1849
Octagon houses in New York (state)
Houses in Erie County, New York
Museums in Erie County, New York
Historic house museums in New York (state)
Historical society museums in New York (state)
1849 establishments in New York (state)
National Register of Historic Places in Erie County, New York